Jerry Lynn Tabb (born March 17, 1952) is an American former professional baseball first baseman. He played all or part of three seasons in Major League Baseball (MLB) from 1976 until 1978, for the Chicago Cubs and Oakland Athletics.

Amateur career 
Tabb was a baseball standout at the University of Tulsa, where, as a freshman, he won the College World Series Most Outstanding Player award in the 1971 College World Series, where Tulsa was the next-to-last team eliminated. He was also the first baseman for Team USA at the 1971 Pan American Games.

Professional career 
The Cubs made Tabb a first-round pick, selected 16th overall, in the 1973 Major League Baseball Draft. He debuted in the majors in September 1976, playing in 11 games for the Cubs and batting .292.

Tabb was purchased from the Cubs by the Athletics the following February, and in  Tabb got an extended chance in the major leagues. The A's were cleaning house, and Tabb was one of five players who received substantial playing time at first base for the team. Tabb batted .222 with 6 home runs and 19 RBI in 51 games. The next season, however, Oakland acquired Dave Revering from the Cincinnati Reds and installed him as their regular first baseman. Tabb managed just 9 at-bats in 1978, his last season in the majors.

Sources 

1952 births
Living people
All-American college baseball players
American expatriate baseball players in Canada
Baseball players at the 1971 Pan American Games
Baseball players from Oklahoma
Chicago Cubs players
College World Series Most Outstanding Player Award winners
Major League Baseball first basemen
Midland Cubs players
Oakland Athletics players
Pan American Games medalists in baseball
Pan American Games silver medalists for the United States
People from Altus, Oklahoma
San Jose Missions players
Tulsa Golden Hurricane baseball players
Vancouver Canadians players
Wichita Aeros players
Medalists at the 1971 Pan American Games